Carnatic raga refers to ragas used in Carnatic music. A Carnatic raga has several components - primordial sound (nāda), tonal system (swara), pitch (śruti), scale, ornaments (gamaka) and important tones.

Origins and history

Carnatic raga classification

Janaka ragas (Melakarta ragas) and Janya ragas(Upanga ragas)

Janaka ragas or Sampoorna ragas are parent ragas from which more ragas are derived. Sampoorna ragas as the name suggest are those in which all 7 swaras are present. They are also called Melakarta ragas. These ragas have all 7 swaras or [notes] in their scales (only one of each swara, Sa, Re, Ga, Ma, Pa, Dha, Ni), following strict ascending and descending scales and are sung in all octaves. Example of melakartha ragas are : Shankarabharanam, Kalyani, Natabhairavi, Chala Nattai, Harikambhoji, Kharaharapriya, Mayamalavagowla, Chakravakam etc.
Janya ragas are ragas that are derived from Janaka ragas (Melakarta ragas). They may have less than 7 notes in their scales, or have additional notes in them, zig-zag (vakra) notes that step up and down, asymmetrical scales, etc. Janya raga is also called as Upanga raga. Example of Upanga ragas are : Malahari, Mohanam, Begada, Shriragam, Hamsadhvani, Vasanta, Janaranjani, Hindolam, Todi etc.

72 Melakartha ragas (Mathematical computation)
There are different types of swara sthayis or note pitches that leads to the total number of melakartha ragas. These different variations of swaras leads to more than one combination of musical scale. The different variations in swaras is mentioned below. Using this it is possible to mathematically ascertain the total number of melakartha ragas.
Sa (Shadja) - only one.
Ri (Rishabha) - Shuddha, Chathushruthi and Shatshruti Rishabha in increasing order of pitch.
Ga (Gandhara) - Shuddha, Sadharana, Antara Gandhara in increasing order of pitch.
Ma (Madhyama) - Shuddha, Prathi Madhyama in increasing order of pitch.
Pa(Panchama)- only one.
Dha (Daivata) -Shuddha, Chatushruti, Shatshruti Daivata in increasing order of pitch. 
Ni (Nishada)- Shuddha, Kaishiki, Kakali Nishadham in increasing order of pitch.
However, there are only some combinations that are allowed as for instance Shatshruthi Ri can combine with Antara Gandhara and Chathushruti Rishabha can combine with Sadharana and Antara Gandhara only. Likewise the same principle holds good for Da and Ni. If we label these swaras as Sa, Ra, Ri, Ru, Ga, Gi, Gu, Ma, Mi, Pa, Dha, Dhi, Dhu, Na, Ni, Nu.
The total combinations are:
a) 1 Sa X 1 Ra X 3(Ga, Gi, Gu) Ga + 1 Sa X Ru X 2 Ga (Gu, Gi) + 1 Sa X Ri X Gu = 6.
b) Ma, Mi =2
c) 1 Pa X Dha X 3 Ni (Na, Ni, Nu)+ 1 Pa X Dhu X 2 Ni (Nu, Ni)+ 1 Pa X Dhi X Ni =6
Multiplying these 3 combinations we get 72.

The 72 melakartha ragas are arranged in a cycle called katapayadi sutra which is named so because by the index of the raga we can get the name of the raga and the exact swara combination. The first 36 melakartha ragas have suddha madhyama whereas, the next 36 ragas have prathi madhyama.

The 72 combinations of melakartha ragas gives rise to a huge variety of musical flavours. Any sampurna raga is present in this 72 melakartha cycle. From these 72 melakartha ragas, there are more than a thousand janya ragas that contain more beautiful musical notations. While getting to know the details of a raga, it is important to know which sampurna raga the janya raga is derived from in order to know the swara types.

Janya ragas

Janya ragas are ragas that are derived from Janaka ragas (Melakarta ragas). They may have less than 7 notes in their scales, or have additional notes in them, zig-zag (vakra) notes that step and down, asymmetrical scales, etc. See full list of Janya ragas. E.g. of janya ragas are bilahari and hamsadhwani (derived from shankarabharana), sriranjani and darbar (derived from kharaharapriya) and so on.

Vakra ragas
Vakra ragas are janya ragas that have swaras arranged in a zig zag manner. For e.g. Raga Sri has the following arohanam and avarohanam :
S R M P N S. S. N P M R G R S.  Such a raga is called vakra raga.

Auḍava rāgas
Auḍava rāgas are janya ragas that have exactly five notes in ascending and descending scale (arohana and avarohana). Examples are :
1)Mohanam (S R G P D S. S. D P G R S) 
2)Hamsadhwani (S R G P N S. S. N P G R S)

Shadava Ragas
Shadava rāgas are janya ragas that have exactly six notes in ascending and descending scale

Components of Carnatic raga
A Carnatic raga has several components - primordial sound (nāda), tonal system (swara), intervals (shruti), scale, ornaments (gamaka) and important tones (vadi and samvadi).

Nāda
An aim of composer-performers of the past and present is to realise nāda, however, the sound that is audible to human ears is only a fraction of primordial sound.

Swara
The Carnatic tonal system consists of seven basic pitches, expressed by the solfa syllables: Sa (shadja), Ri (rishabha), Ga (gandhara), Ma (madhyama), Pa (panchama), Da (dhaivata) and Ni (nishadha).

Scale
A Carnatic raga consists of an ascending and descending scale pattern (known as aarohana and avarohana respectively). Both ascent and descent should have at least five tones, although rarer ragas contain fewer tones. Scales establish rules for all performers to adhere to in melodic performance, and provide a tonal boundary. Typical scale features also act to help listeners identify ragas.

Gamaka
Gamaka, or ornamentation, is essential in Carnatic raga performance. Gamaka encompasses controlled shaking, articulating, sliding, glottal stops and other vocal or instrumental manipulation.

The swara and scale defines only the skeletal structure of a raga. The handling of Gamaka actually defines the raga.

Raga in improvisation

Types
Improvisation in raga is the soul of Indian classical music - an essential aspect. "Manodharma sangeetham" or "kalpana sangeetham" ("music of imagination") as it is known in Carnatic music, embraces several varieties of improvisation.

Raga Alapana

An alapana, sometimes also called ragam, is the exposition of a raga or tone - a slow improvisation with no rhythm, where the raga acts as the basis of embellishment. In performing alapana, performers consider each raga as an object that has beginnings and endings and consists somehow of sequences of thought.

The performer will explore the ragam and touch on its various nuances, singing in the lower octaves first, then gradually moving up to higher octaves, while giving a hint of the song to be performed.

Niraval

Niraval, usually performed by the more advanced performers, consists of singing one or two lines of a song repeatedly, but with a series of melodic improvised elaborations. The lines are then also played at different levels of speed which can include double speed, triple speed, quadruple speed and even sextuple speed.

Kalpanaswaram

Kalpanaswaram, also known as swarakalpana, consists of improvising melodic and rhythmic passages using swaras (solfa syllables). Kalpanaswaras are sung to end on a particular swara in the raga of the melody and at a specific place (idam) in the tala cycle. Generally, the swaras are sung to end on the samam (the first beat of the rhythmical cycle), and can be sung at the same speed or double the speed of the melody that is being sung, though some artists sing triple-speed phrases too.

Tanam
Tanam is one of the most important forms of improvisation, and is integral to Ragam-Tanam-Pallavi. Originally developed for the veena, it consists of expanding the raga with syllables like tha, nam, thom, aa, nom, na, etc.

Ragam-Tanam-Pallavi

Ragam-Tanam-Pallavi is the principal long form in concerts, and is a composite form of improvisation. As the name suggests, it consists of raga alapana, tanam, and a pallavi line. Set to a slow-paced tala, the pallavi line is often composed by the performer. Through niraval, the performer manipulates the pallavi line in complex melodic and rhythmic ways. The niraval is followed by kalpanaswarams.

Learning and performing
When learning a raga, it is never enough just to know the basic scale of the raga. In fact, different ragas can sometimes have the same scales. For example, the raga pairs Bhairavi and Manji, Mayamalavagowla and Nadanamakriya, Bilahari and Mand, Shankarabharanam and Kurinji, among others, have exactly the same scale, but are clearly distinct ragas due to the way the notes and musical phrases are rendered. In addition, the scale of the raga often does not offer insight into some of the subtleties of the raga, such as usage of gamakas, anya swaras, and ragabhavam. This is especially true for heavier ragas like Yadhukula Kambodhi, Thodi, Sahana, Huseni, Varali, etc.

An interesting case to observe is the similarity between the ragas Darbar and Nayaki. Both are upanga janyas of the 22nd mela Kharaharapriya, and have similar patterns in both their ascending and descending scales. However the two ragas are distinctly different, especially where the usage of the gandhara and nishada are concerned. When singing Darbar, these swaras are rendered more quickly with gamaka, and shine especially well when jante prayogas are used in the descending. On the other hand, these swaras are more elongated in Nayaki, as illustrated in the pallavi of Muttusvami Dikshitar's famous composition, RanganayakamBhavayeham.

The best way to learn a raga and account for all its subtleties, therefore, is to refer to compositions, which often contain a wealth of phrases that lend beauty to the raga. Before an artist attempts to sing a raga, he or she should be familiar with several compositions in that raga. He or she should have also listened to many different renderings of the raga by various artists, in order to get a better sense of how certain phrases can be applied.

Improvisation and gender

Raga in dance and drama

Raga in non-classical traditions

Raga in devotional poetry and song

Raga in Harikatha
The Harikatha tradition, which originated in the Indian state of Maharashtra, involves popular storytelling combined with dance and music. Krishna Bhagavathar, an exponent of Carnatic music, is responsible for creating the South Indian harikatha style - singing in raga, dancing with tala, and narrating stories in a manner that sustains the attention of the audience. In effect, Harikatha is an art form that requires knowledge of raga, Carnatic music, dance, speech, diction and dramatic technique. Harikatha performance aims to communicate with non-literate and literate audiences. Ajjada Adibhatla Narayana Das is credited as creator of modern Harikatha format.

Well-known harikatha performers had sound knowledge of Carnatic music in the early part of the 20th century - some were well established Carnatic musicians, while others were composers. Today, a few performers keep this tradition alive and use ragas from both Carnatic music and Hindustani music traditions.

Raga Discovery

In Indian classical music, ragas are precise and well organised melodic structures which have the capability to evoke distinct moods and emotions. There are many attempts of raga creations by  Harikesanallur Muthaiah Bhagavathar and many others. In 21st century Dr. M. Balamuralikrishna who has created raga in three notes  Ragas such as Mahathi, Lavangi, Sidhdhi, Sumukham that he created have only four notes.

Raga and light classical music

Raga in film songs
In south Indian cinema, you will find many examples where a film song is composed based on a Carnatic raga or song. Generally pleasant ragas like Mohanam, Shankarabharanam, Kalyani, etc. find their way into numerous film songs.

Here are some excerpts from Telugu cinema:
 Om namashivaya from Sagara Sangamam - Hindolam raga.
 Nada vinodamu from Sagara Sangamam - sriranjini.
 Omkara nadanu Sankarabharanam- sankarabharanam.
 Shivashankari from Jagadeka Veeruni Katha- Darbaari Kaanada.
 Paadana vani kalyaniga from Meghasandesam - Kalyani.

Here are some excerpts from Tamil cinema:
 Adhisaya Ragam from Aboorva Ragangal movie - Mahathi raga. 
 Aadatha manamum undo from Manadhi Mannan movie - Lathangi Raga.
 Pon enben from Policekaran magal movie - Darbari Kanada Raga. 
 Paatum Naane from Thiruvilaiyadal movie - Gowrimanohari Raga. 
 Maname muruganin from Motor sundaram pillai Movie - Hindolam Raga. 
 Thenavan Thaainaatu singarame from Tenaliraman movie - Reethi Gowla Raga.
 Isaiketaal puvi from Thavapudhalvan movie - Kalyani Raga.
 Thanga Radham vandhadhu from Kalaikovil movie - Abhogi Raga.
 Sivakami Aadavandhal from Paatum Bharathamum movie - Amritavarshini Raga.
 Nadhamenum Kovilile from Manamadha leelai movie - Sri ranjani Raga.
 Poi vaa magale from Karnan movie - Aananda Bhairavi Raga.
 Kallellam Maanika kallaguma from Alayamani movie - Mayamalavagowla Raga.
 Maadhavi Ponmayilaal from Iru Malargal Movie - Karaharapriya Raga.
 Pon ondru kanden from Padithaal matum podhuma - Brindavana Saranga Raga.
 Aadal Kalaye Deivam Thandhadhu from Raghavendra movie - Charukesi Raga.
 Rukku Rukku from Avvai Shanmukhi - Sahana Raga.
 Kalaivaniye from Sindhu Bhairavi - Kalyani Raga.
 Poomalai Vangi  from Sindhu Bhairavi - Kanada Raga.
 Kannodu Kanbadethallam from Jeans - Abheri Raga.
 Sorgame Enralum - Hamsanadam Raga.
Aaruyire Aaruyire - Charukesi Raga.

In Hindi cinema:
Mand Raaga - Tu Chanda main Chandani (Reshma aur Shera)

See also

 List of composers who created ragas
 Carnatic music
 Raga

Notes

References
 Kassebaum, Gayathri Rajapur. ‘Karnatak raga’ (2000). In 
 Karnataka Sangeetha Darpana, by Smt. T Sharada and T Shachidevi, Part 2 in Kannada and English